The 2014 Russell Athletic Bowl was a college football bowl game played on December 29, 2014, at Orlando Citrus Bowl Stadium in Orlando, Florida. This was the 25th Russell Athletic Bowl. It was one of the 2014–15 NCAA football bowl games that conclude the 2014 NCAA Division I FBS football season. It was sponsored by the Russell Athletic uniform company.

The game featured the Oklahoma Sooners and the Clemson Tigers. Oklahoma placed in a three-way tie for fourth in the Big 12 Conference. Clemson was the runner-up in the Atlantic Division of the Atlantic Coast Conference.

This was the fourth overall meeting between these two teams, with Oklahoma leading the series 2–1 going into the game. The previous time these two teams met was in the 1989 Citrus Bowl, when Clemson won 13–6.

Kickoff was expected to be around 5:30 pm ET.

Game summary

Scoring summary

Source:

Statistics

References

Russell Athletic Bowl
Cheez-It Bowl
Oklahoma Sooners football bowl games
Clemson Tigers football bowl games
American football in Orlando, Florida
Russell Athletic Bowl
2010s in Orlando, Florida
Russell Athletic Bowl